Populous, legally Populous Holdings, Inc., is a global architectural and design practice specializing in sports facilities, arenas and convention centers, as well as the planning and design of major special events.

Populous was created through a management buyout in January 2009, becoming independently owned and operated. It is reported to be one of the largest architecture firms in the world. Populous formerly operated as HOK Sport Venue Event, which was part of the HOK Group.

History

Company development
In 1983, HOK under Jerry Sincoff created a sports group (initially called the Sports Facilities Group and later changed to HOK Sport Venue Event). The firm initially consisted of eight architects in Kansas City, and grew to employ 185 people by 1996. The HOK Sport studio was led by architect Ron Labinski, who has been described as "the world's first sports venue architect."

On several projects, HOK Sport had teamed with international design practice LOBB Partnership, which maintained offices in London, England, and Brisbane, Australia. On HOK Sport's 15th anniversary in November 1998, the firm merged with LOBB. The new practice retained headquarters in all three cities.

The Kansas City, Missouri, office was first based in the city's Garment District in the Lucas Place office building. In 2005, it moved into its headquarters at 300 Wyandotte in the River Market neighborhood in a new building it designed, on land developed as an urban renewal project through tax incentives from the city's Planned Industrial Expansion Authority. It was the first major company to relocate to the neighborhood in several decades. In March 2009, HOK Sport Venue Event changed its name to Populous after a managers' buyout by HOK Group.

In October 2015, Populous relocated to its new Americas headquarters at the newly renovated Board of Trade building at 4800 Main street near the Country Club Plaza in Kansas City.

The company is one of several Kansas City-based sports design firms that trace their roots to Kivett and Myers which designed the Truman Sports Complex which was one of the first modern large single purpose sports stadiums (previously, stadiums were designed for multipurpose use). Other firms with sports design presence in Kansas City that trace their roots to Kivett include Ellerbe Becket Inc. and HNTB Corp. 360 Architecture is also based in Kansas City.

"Retro" era of baseball parks

Populous is credited for spearheading a new era of baseball park design in the 1990s, beginning with Oriole Park at Camden Yards in Baltimore. At Camden Yards, and in other stadiums built by Populous soon thereafter, such as Coors Field in Denver and Progressive Field in Cleveland, the ballpark was designed to incorporate aesthetic elements of the city's history and older "classic ballparks." Camden Yards's red brick facade emulates the massive B&O Warehouse that dominates the right field view behind Eutaw Street, whereas Progressive Field's glass and steel exterior "call[s] to mind the drawbridges and train trestles that crisscross the nearby Cuyahoga River." Starting with Great American Ball Park in Cincinnati in 2003, a number of Populous Sport's stadiums featured more contemporary and even futuristic designs. Subsequent stadium exteriors featuring this motif opened in Washington, D.C. and Minnesota.

In addition to moving away from the concrete exteriors of the "cookie-cutter" multi-purpose stadiums that preceded the new parks, Populous incorporated other innovative touches: natural grass playing surfaces (instead of artificial turf), asymmetrical field dimensions, various park-specific idiosyncrasies (like Tal's Hill in Houston), and less foul territory that would keep fans farther from the diamond. And because the stadiums were designed for baseball instead of several sports, the sightlines were "uniformly excellent."

Camden Yards was hugely popular with baseball fans, and its success convinced many cities to invest public funds in their own new ballparks to help revitalize struggling urban neighborhoods. From 1992 to 2012, HOK Sport/Populous were the lead architects on 14 Major League Baseball stadiums and helped renovate four existing stadiums.

Criticism
Populous's designs across Major League Baseball have become so prevalent that some critics have asserted that the distinctiveness that was originally found in early retro-classic ballparks is impossible to maintain. Some older ballparks like Fenway Park have strange dimensions because of the small parcels of land on which the parks were built. Most new stadiums are built on larger, dedicated land parcels. One sportswriter said the attempt to emulate the old parks' quirks is "contrived."

Some commentators have criticized a tendency to cater new ballparks toward wealthier ticket buyers, such as with expanded numbers of luxury suites. Several writers have noted that upper deck seating at new ballparks may actually be farther away from the field than in the older parks, partly as a result of these new upper decks being pushed higher by rows of luxury suites. One writer in The New Yorker said it is "not quite right to credit or blame Populous" for trends in their new stadiums—as it is ultimately team owners that plan what they want in future stadiums—but that the firm "certainly enabled" such changes.

Offices

 Kansas City, Missouri, U.S.
 London, UK
 Boston, U.S.
 Brisbane, Australia
 San Francisco, U.S.
 Denver, U.S.
 Knoxville, Tennessee, U.S.
 New York City, United States
 Dallas, Texas, United States
 Norman, Oklahoma, United States
 New Delhi, India
 Sydney, Australia
 Singapore
 Beijing, China
 Melbourne, Australia

Sports projects

Cricket
 The Oval, London, UK - Surrey County Cricket Club, English national cricket team (2005)
 Warner Stand at Lord's, London, UK - English national cricket team (2017)
 Media Center at Manuka Oval, Canberra, Australia - Australian national cricket team (2018)
Narendra Modi Stadium, Ahmedabad, India - Gujarat Cricket Association GCA (2020)

Baseball

MLB
 Hard Rock Stadium, Miami Gardens, Florida – NFL Miami Dolphins, MLB Florida Marlins (1987)
 Wrigley Field renovations, Chicago- Chicago Cubs (1988–2018)
 Tropicana Field – St. Petersburg, Florida (joint project with Lescher & Mahoney Sports (Tampa) & Criswell, Blizzard & Blouin Architects (St. Pete) - Tampa Bay Rays (1990)
 Guaranteed Rate Field, Chicago – Chicago White Sox (1991)
 Oriole Park at Camden Yards, Baltimore – Baltimore Orioles (1992)
 Progressive Field, Cleveland – Cleveland Indians (1994)
 Coors Field, Denver, Colorado – Colorado Rockies (1995)
 Angel Stadium of Anaheim, Anaheim, California (renovation of Anaheim Stadium, joint project with Walt Disney Imagineering) – Los Angeles Angels (1998)
 Comerica Park, Detroit – Detroit Tigers (2000)
 Minute Maid Park, Houston – Houston Astros (2000)
 Oracle Park, San Francisco – San Francisco Giants (2000)
 PNC Park, Pittsburgh – Pittsburgh Pirates (2001)
 Great American Ball Park, Cincinnati – Cincinnati Reds (2003)
 Citizens Bank Park, Philadelphia (joint project with Ewing Cole Cherry Brott of Philadelphia) – Philadelphia Phillies (2004)
 Petco Park, San Diego – San Diego Padres (2004)
 Busch Stadium, St. Louis, Missouri – St. Louis Cardinals (2006)
 Nationals Park, Washington, D.C. – Washington Nationals (2008)
 Kauffman Stadium, Kansas City – Kansas City Royals (renovations in 1997 and 2009)
 Citi Field, Willets Point, Queens, New York – New York Mets (2009)
 Yankee Stadium, Bronx, New York – New York Yankees (2009)
 Target Field, Minneapolis – Minnesota Twins (2010)
 LoanDepot Park, Miami – Miami Marlins (2012)
 Truist Park, Cumberland, Georgia – Atlanta Braves (2017)

MiLB
 Stanley Coveleski Regional Stadium, South Bend, Indiana – A South Bend Silver Hawks (1987)
 FNB Field, Harrisburg, Pennsylvania – AA Harrisburg Senators (1987)
 Sahlen Field, Buffalo, New York – AAA Buffalo Bisons (1988)
 Northwestern Medicine Field, Geneva, Illinois – A Kane County Cougars (1991)
 Principal Park, Des Moines, Iowa - AAA Iowa Cubs (1992)
 Harbor Park, Norfolk, Virginia – AAA Norfolk Tides (1993)
 Smith's Ballpark, Salt Lake City – AAA Salt Lake Bees (1994)
 Durham Bulls Athletic Park, Durham, North Carolina – AAA Durham Bulls (1995)
 Victory Field, Indianapolis – AAA Indianapolis Indians (1996)
 The Hangar, Lancaster, California – A Lancaster JetHawks (1996)
 Senator Thomas J. Dodd Memorial Stadium, Norwich, Connecticut- A Norwich Sea Unicorns (1996)
 San Manuel Stadium, San Bernardino, California – A Inland Empire 66ers of San Bernardino (1997)
 Joseph P. Riley Jr. Park, Charleston, South Carolina – A Charleston RiverDogs (1997)
 Canal Park, Akron, Ohio - AA Akron RubberDucks (1997)
 LeLacheur Park, Lowell, Massachusetts – A Lowell Spinners (1998)
 Autozone Park, Memphis, Tennessee - AAA Memphis Redbirds (2000)
 Chukchansi Park, Fresno, California – AAA Fresno Grizzlies (2002)
 Baseball Grounds of Jacksonville, Jacksonville, Florida – AA Jacksonville Jumbo Shrimp (2003)
 Isotopes Park, Albuquerque, New Mexico – AAA Albuquerque Isotopes (2003)
 Modern Woodmen Park, Davenport, Iowa - A Quad Cities River Bandits (2004)
 Montgomery Riverwalk Stadium, Montgomery, Alabama - AA Montgomery Biscuits (2004)
 Bright House Field, Clearwater, Florida – A Clearwater Threshers (2004)
 Trustmark Park, Pearl, Mississippi – AA Mississippi Braves (2005)
 Dow Diamond, Midland, Michigan – A Great Lakes Loons (2007)
 Arvest Ballpark, Springdale, Arkansas – AA Northwest Arkansas Naturals (2008)
 Coca-Cola Park, Allentown, Pennsylvania – AAA Lehigh Valley IronPigs (2008)
 Parkview Field, Fort Wayne, Indiana – A Fort Wayne TinCaps (2009)
 ONEOK Field, Tulsa, Oklahoma – AA Tulsa Drillers (2010)
 NBT Bank Stadium, Syracuse, New York – AAA Syracuse Chiefs (1997)
 Community Maritime Park, Pensacola, Florida – AA Pensacola Blue Wahoos (2012)
 Southwest University Park, El Paso, Texas – AAA El Paso Chihuahuas (2014)
 First Horizon Park, Nashville, Tennessee – AAA Nashville Sounds (2015)
 Spirit Communications Park, Columbia, South Carolina (2016)

NCAA
 Baum Stadium, Fayetteville, Arkansas – Arkansas Razorbacks (1996)
 Tony Gwynn Stadium, San Diego, California- San Diego State Aztecs baseball (1997)
 Tointon Family Stadium, Manhattan, Kansas - Kansas State Wildcats (2002)
 Doug Kingsmore Stadium, Clemson, South Carolina - Clemson Tigers baseball (2003)
 Dick Howser Stadium, Tallahassee, Florida- Florida State Seminoles baseball (2004) 
 Alex Box Stadium, Baton Rouge, Louisiana- LSU Tigers baseball (2008)
 Ray Fisher Stadium Renovation – Wilpon Baseball and Softball Complex, Ann Arbor, Michigan – Michigan Wolverines (2008)
 Bryson Field at Boshamer Stadium, Chapel Hill, North Carolina – North Carolina Tar Heels (2009)
 Carolina Stadium, Columbia, South Carolina – University of South Carolina Gamecocks (2009)
 USF Baseball Stadium at Red McEwen Field and USF Softball Stadium, Tampa, Florida – University of South Florida Bulls (2011)
 Triton Ballpark Renovation, La Jolla, California – University of California, San Diego Tritons (2015)

KBO
 Changwon NC Park, Changwon, South Gyeongsang Province, South Korea - NC Dinos (2019)

Basketball

NBA/WNBA
 BMO Harris Bradley Center, Milwaukee – Milwaukee Bucks (1988-2018) (Demolished)
 United Center, Chicago – Chicago Bulls (1994)
 Ball Arena, Denver – Denver Nuggets (1999)
 State Farm Arena, Atlanta – Atlanta Hawks (1999)
 Scotiabank Arena, Toronto, Canada – Toronto Raptors (1999)
 Toyota Center, Houston, Texas – Houston Rockets, Houston Comets (2003)
 Prudential Center, Newark, New Jersey – New Jersey Nets, New York Liberty (2007)
 Amway Center, Orlando, Florida – Orlando Magic (2010)
 Fiserv Forum, Milwaukee – Milwaukee Bucks (2018)
 Climate Pledge Arena, Seattle, Washington – Seattle Storm (2021)

NCAA
 BMO Harris Bradley Center, Milwaukee – Marquette Golden Eagles (1988-2018) (Demolished)
 Reynolds Center, Tulsa – University of Tulsa Golden Hurricane home court (1988)
 Kohl Center, Madison, Wisconsin – Wisconsin Badgers (1998)
 Ryan Center, Kingston, Rhode Island - Rhode Island Rams (2002) 
 Mizzou Arena – Columbia, Missouri – Missouri Tigers (2005)
 Addition Financial Arena, Orlando, Florida – UCF Knights (2007)
 KFC Yum! Center, Louisville, Kentucky – Louisville Cardinals (2010)
 Ford Center, Evansville, Indiana – Evansville Purple Aces (2011)
 Trojan Arena, Troy, Alabama - Troy Trojans men's basketball (2012)
 Fiserv Forum, Milwaukee – Marquette Golden Eagles (2018)

Association football

Brazil
 Arena das Dunas – Natal, Brazil – America-RN (2013)

England
 John Smith's Stadium – Huddersfield, England – Huddersfield (1994)
 University of Bolton Stadium – Bolton, England – Bolton (1997)
 Sir Bobby Robson Stand at Portman Road – Ipswich, England – Ipswich (2002)
 Emirates Stadium – London – Arsenal (2006)
 Stadium:mk – Milton Keynes – MK Dons (2007)
 Wembley Stadium – London – England (joint project with Foster and Partners) (2007)
 Fossetts Farm Stadium – Southend – Southend United (under construction)
 Etihad Stadium expansion – Manchester – Manchester City (2015)
 Tottenham Hotspur Stadium – London – Tottenham (2019)
 Craven Cottage  new Riverside stand- London - Fulham Football Club (2022)

France
 Parc Olympique Lyonnais – Décines-Charpieu, France – Olympique Lyonnais (2016)

Kazakhstan
Astana Arena, Nur-Sultan, Kazakhstan (2009)

Mexico
 Estadio Akron – Zapopan, Jalisco, Mexico – Guadalajara (2010)
 Estadio BBVA – Monterrey, Nuevo León, Mexico – C.F. Monterrey (2014)

Portugal
 Estádio da Luz – Lisbon, Portugal – Benfica (2003)
 Estádio Algarve – Loulé, Portugal – S.C. Farense, Louletano D.C. (2004)

Russia
 Ak Bars Arena – Kazan, Russia – Rubin (2013)

South Africa
 FNB Stadium (formerly Soccer City) – Johannesburg, South Africa – South Africa (2009)

Sweden
 Friends Arena – Stockholm, Sweden – Sweden (2012)

United States
 Downtown soccer stadium – Rochester, New York – Rochester Rhinos (2006)
 Dick's Sporting Goods Park – Commerce City, Colorado – Colorado Rapids (2007)
 Children's Mercy Park – Kansas City, Kansas – Sporting Kansas City (2011)
 PNC Stadium – Houston, Texas – Houston Dynamo (2012)
 Exploria Stadium – Orlando, Florida – Orlando City SC (2017)
 Audi Field – District of Columbia – D.C. United (2018)
 Allianz Field – Saint Paul, Minnesota – Minnesota United (2019)
 TQL Stadium - Cincinnati, Ohio - FC Cincinnati (2021)
 Geodis Park - Nashville, Tennessee - Nashville SC (2022)

American football

NFL
 Hard Rock Stadium, Miami Gardens, Florida – Miami Dolphins; University of Miami football; Orange Bowl; Super Bowl XXIII, XXIX, XLI, XLIV, and LIV (1987)
 TIAA Bank Field – Jacksonville Jaguars; Gator Bowl; Georgia vs. Florida football game; Super Bowl XXXIX (1995)
 Bank of America Stadium, Charlotte, North Carolina – Carolina Panthers; Duke's Mayo Bowl (1996)
 Raymond James Stadium, Tampa, Florida – Tampa Bay Buccaneers; University of South Florida football; Outback Bowl; Super Bowl XXXV, XLIII, and LV (1996)
 FedExField, Landover, Maryland – Washington Commanders (1997)
 M&T Bank Stadium, Baltimore – Baltimore Ravens (1998)
 Nissan Stadium, Nashville, Tennessee – Tennessee Titans; Music City Bowl (1999)
 FirstEnergy Stadium, Cleveland, Ohio – Cleveland Browns (1999)
 Acrisure Stadium, Pittsburgh – Pittsburgh Steelers; University of Pittsburgh football (2001)
 Gillette Stadium, Foxborough, Massachusetts – New England Patriots (2002)
 NRG Stadium, Houston, Texas – Houston Texans; Texas Bowl; Super Bowl XXXVIII (2002)
 State Farm Stadium, Glendale, Arizona – Arizona Cardinals; Fiesta Bowl; Super Bowl XLII (2006)
 Arrowhead Stadium, Kansas City – Kansas City Chiefs (renovations 2007–2010)
 Highmark Stadium (renovation), Orchard Park, New York – Buffalo Bills (2014)

NCAA
 Huntington Bank Stadium, Minneapolis – Minnesota Golden Gophers (2009)
 Kyle Field (redevelopment plan), College Station, Texas – Texas A&M Aggies (2012)
 McLane Stadium, Waco, Texas – Baylor Bears (2012)
Canvas Stadium, Fort Collins, Colorado- Colorado State Rams (joint project with ICON Venue Group) (2017)
 Protective Stadium, Birmingham, Alabama – UAB Blazers (2021)

Australian football
 Marvel Stadium, Melbourne, Victoria – Carlton Blues; Essendon Bombers; North Melbourne Kangaroos; St Kilda Saints; Western Bulldogs (2000)
 GMBHA Stadium, Geelong, Victoria – Geelong Cats (2010)
 Metricon Stadium, Gold Coast, Queensland – Gold Coast Suns (2011)
 Spotless Stadium, Sydney, New South Wales – Greater Western Sydney Giants (2012)
 Perth Stadium, Perth, Western Australia - Fremantle Dockers and West Coast Eagles (2017)

E-sports and Performance Venues
 Daily's Place, Jacksonville, Florida (2017)
 Esports Stadium Arlington, Arlington, Texas (2018)
 Fusion Arena, Philadelphia, Pennsylvania (2020)

General purpose arenas
 SNHU Arena, Manchester, New Hampshire (2001)
 Desert Diamond Arena – Glendale, Arizona (2003)
 Oval Lingotto Turin, Italy (2005)
 Taipei Arena, Taipei, Taiwan (2005)
 The O2, London, UK (formerly the Millennium Dome) (2007)
 T-Mobile Center, Kansas City, Missouri (2007)
 3Arena, Dublin (formerly The O2 Dublin) (2008)
 Ford Center – Evansville, Indiana – Used for Professional Ice Hockey, College Basketball, and Music Concerts (2011)
 First Direct Arena, Leeds (2013)
 Philippine Arena – Manila, Philippines (2014)
 Darling Harbour Live Theatre, Sydney, Australia (2016)
 Coca-Cola Arena, Dubai, UAE (2019)
 Bristol Arena, Bristol (2020)

Horse racing
 Athens Racecourse, Athens, Greece (1971) 
 Aintree Racecourse, Aintree, UK (1985)
 Ascot Racecourse, Berkshire, UK (2006)
 Eagle Farm Racecourse, Brisbane, Australia (2016)

Ice hockey

NHL
 Honda Center – Anaheim, California – Anaheim Ducks (1993)
 United Center – Chicago – Chicago Blackhawks (1995)
 Bridgestone Arena – Nashville, Tennessee – Nashville Predators (1996)
 Scotiabank Arena – Toronto, Canada – Toronto Maple Leafs (1999)
 Ball Arena – Denver – Colorado Avalanche (1999)
 Xcel Energy Center – St. Paul, Minnesota – Minnesota Wild (2000)
 Prudential Center – Newark, New Jersey – New Jersey Devils (2007)
 PPG Paints Arena – Pittsburgh – Pittsburgh Penguins (2010)
 Videotron Centre – Quebec City – Potential new or relocated NHL team and Quebec Remparts, QMJHL (2015; joint project with ABCP Architecture and GLCRM & Associates)
 T-Mobile Arena – Las Vegas – Vegas Golden Knights (2016)
 UBS Arena – New York City, New York – New York Islanders (2021)
 Climate Pledge Arena – Seattle, Washington – Seattle Kraken (2021)

AHL
 BMO Harris Bradley Center, Milwaukee – Milwaukee Admirals (1988-2018) (Demolished)
 GIANT Center – Hershey, Pennsylvania – Hershey Bears (2002)
 Toyota Center – Houston, Texas – Houston Aeros (2003–2013)
 SNHU Arena, Manchester, New Hampshire – Manchester Monarchs (2001)
 Wells Fargo Arena at the Iowa Events Center, Des Moines, Iowa – Iowa Wild (2013–14 season)

ECHL
 Maverik Center – West Valley City, Utah – Utah Grizzlies, 2002 Winter Olympics (1997)
 Ford Center – Evansville, Indiana – Evansville Ice Men (2011)
 Indiana Farmers Coliseum – Indianapolis, Indiana - Indy Fuel (2014)

Motor Sports Facilities
Silverstone Circuit, Silverstone, UK (2011)
Mandalika International Street Circuit, Central Lombok, Indonesia (2021)

Multipurpose
 Ervin J. Nutter Center – Fairborn, Ohio – NCAA Wright State Raiders (1990)
 Alamodome – San Antonio, Texas (1993)
 Hong Kong Stadium – So Kon Po, Hong Kong (1994)
 Manchester Velodrome – Manchester, England, UK (1994)
 Millennium Stadium – Cardiff, UK – Wales football team and Wales rugby union team (1999)
 ANZ Stadium – Sydney, Australia – 2000 Summer Olympics (1999)
 Sky Stadium Wellington, New Zealand (2000)
 Nanjing Olympic Sports Center – Nanjing, China (2004)
 Croke Park – Dublin, Ireland – Gaelic Athletic Association (2004)
 Queensland Tennis Centre – Tennyson, Queensland, Australia (2009)
 Birmingham–Jefferson Convention Complex multi-purpose facility (convention space/stadium) – Birmingham, Alabama (ground-breaking held September 21, 2009)
 Ravenscraig Regional Sports Facility – Motherwell, Scotland, UK (2010)
 Aviva Stadium – Dublin, Ireland – Ireland rugby union team and Ireland football team (joint project with Scott Tallon Walker) (2010)
 Zayed Sports City Stadium - Abu Dhabi, UAE (2010)
 Forsyth Barr Stadium – Dunedin, New Zealand (2011)
 Rugby League Park- Christchurch, New Zealand (2012)
 London Stadium (Olympic Stadium) - London, UK - West Ham United F.C. and British Athletics (2012)
 Incheon Asiad Main Stadium – Incheon, South Korea
 Taipei Dome – Taipei, Taiwan
 Philippine Arena Multi-purpose facility – Bulacan, Philippines – basketball-themed mixed-use development (2014)
 LECOM Harborcenter – Buffalo, New York – hockey-themed mixed-use development (2015)
 Perth Stadium – Perth, Western Australia (architectural consultants – 2018)
 Western Sydney Stadium – Western Sydney, Australia (2016)
 Kai Tak Sports Park – Kowloon, Hong Kong (2023)

Rugby
 Accor Stadium, Sydney, Australia (1999)
 Sky Stadium, Wellington, New Zealand (1999)
 Suncorp Stadium – Brisbane, Queensland, Australia – NRL Brisbane Broncos (2003)
 cbus Super Stadium – Gold Coast, Queensland, Australia – NRL Gold Coast Titans (2008)
 Eden Park, Auckland, New Zealand (2010)
 Forsyth Barr Stadium, Dunedin, New Zealand (2011)

Tennis
 Queensland Tennis Centre, Brisbane, Australia (2009)
 Wimbledon AELTC, London, UK (2009)
 Margaret Court Arena, Melbourne, Victoria, Australia (2014)
 Zhuhai Tennis Centre, Zhuhai, China (2015)

Training facilities
 Pennsylvania State University Training Facility – University Park, Pennsylvania (1999)
 Hohokam Stadium, Mesa, Arizona- Oakland Athletics spring training facility (1997)
 JetBlue Park at Fenway South, Fort Myers, Florida – Boston Red Sox Spring Training facility (2012)
 GWS Giants Learning Life Centre, Sydney, Australia (2013)
 Texas A&M Bright Football Complex, College Station, U.S. (2015)
 Brisbane Broncos Training, Administration and Community Facility, Brisbane, Australia (2017)

Venue projects

Convention and civic centers
 University of Houston Athletics and Alumni Center – Houston, Texas (1995)
 Grand River Event Center – Dubuque, Iowa, U.S. (2003)
 Iowa Events Center – Des Moines, Iowa, U.S. (2005)
 Peoria Civic Center Expansion – Peoria, Illinois, U.S. (2007)
 Phoenix Convention Center – Phoenix, Arizona, U.S. (2008)
 Utah Valley Convention Center - Provo, Utah, U.S. (2010)
 Qatar National Convention Centre, Education City, Qatar (2011)
 San Jose McEnery Convention Center Expansion, San Jose, U.S. (2014)
 Darling Harbour Live, Sydney, Australia (2016)
 ICC Sydney, Sydney, Australia (2016)
 Henry B. Gonzalez Convention Centre, San Antonio, U.S. (2016)
 World Trade Center Bhubaneswar – Bhubaneswar, Odisha, India (2017)
 Anaheim Convention Center - Anaheim, California, U.S. (2017)

Music and entertainment venues 

 MSG Sphere Las Vegas  (groundbreaking in September 2018, scheduled completion 2021)
 MSG Sphere London  (announced in 2018, in design stages)

Event projects

Olympics
 1996 Atlanta, Georgia, U.S.
 2000 Sydney, NSW, Australia
 2002 Salt Lake City, Utah, U.S.
 2004 Athens, Greece
 2006 Torino, Italy
 2008 Beijing, China
 2010 Vancouver, BC, Canada
 2012 London, England, UK
 2014 Sochi, Russia
 2016 Chicago, Illinois, U.S. (Bid; lost to Rio de Janeiro, Brazil)
2024 Paris, France (Bid)

Commonwealth Games 
 2014 Glasgow, Scotland

National Football League
(selected events)

 1985 – Super Bowl XX – New Orleans, Louisiana
1987 – Super Bowl XXI – Pasadena, California
 1990–1992 – NFL American Bowl – Berlin, Germany
 1994 – Super Bowl XXVIII – Atlanta, Georgia
 2002–2007 – NFL Pro Bowl – Honolulu, Hawaii
 2004 – Super Bowl XXXVIII Houston, Texas
 2005 – Super Bowl XXXIX – Jacksonville, Florida
 2006 – Super Bowl XL – Detroit, Michigan
 2007 – Super Bowl XLI – Miami Gardens, Florida
 2008 – Super Bowl XLII – Glendale, Arizona
 2009 – Super Bowl XLIII – Tampa, Florida
 2010 – Super Bowl XLIV – Miami, Florida
2011 – Super Bowl XLV  – Arlington, Texas
2012 – Super Bowl XLVI – Indianapolis, Indiana
2013 – Super Bowl XLVII – New Orleans, Louisiana
2020 – Super Bowl LIV  –  Miami Gardens, Florida
2021 - Super Bowl LV - Tampa, Florida
2007–present – NFL London Games –  London, England
2016–present – NFL Mexico Game – Mexico City, Mexico
2017–present –  NFL Pro Bowl –  Orlando, Florida

Major League Baseball
Major League Baseball All-Star Game
 1993 – Baltimore, Maryland
 1997 – Cleveland, Ohio
 1998 – Denver, Colorado 
 1999 – Boston, Massachusetts
 2000 – Atlanta, Georgia
 2001 – Seattle, Washington
 2002 – Milwaukee, Wisconsin
 2003 – Chicago, Illinois
 2004 – Houston, Texas
 2005 – Detroit, Michigan
 2006 – Pittsburgh, Pennsylvania
 2007 – San Francisco, California
 2009 – St. Louis, Missouri
 2013 – Queens, New York City, New York
 2014 – Minneapolis, Minnesota

Association football 
(Selected events)
 1986 – FIFA/UNICEF World All Star Game – Los Angeles, California, U.S.
 1994 – FIFA World Cup – 9 US cities 
 1996 – Major League Soccer Inaugural Game – San Jose, California, U.S.
 1998 – FIFA World Cup – Toulouse, France 
 2002 – FIFA World Cup – Korea/Japan 
 2010 – FIFA World Cup – Johannesburg, South Africa 
 2014 – FIFA World Cup – Natal, Brazil 
 2018 – FIFA World Cup – Kazan, Russia

Other events
(Selected Events)
 1986 – NBA All Star Game – Indianapolis, Indiana, U.S.
 1996 – Democratic National Convention – Chicago, Illinois, U.S.
 1998 – NCAA Basketball Women's Final Four – Kansas City, Missouri, U.S.
 1999 – Rugby World Cup – Cardiff, Wales, UK
 2002 – Modern Pentathlon World Championships – Stanford, California, U.S.
 2004 – The Main Street Event – Houston, Texas, U.S.
 2005 – US Women's Open Golf – Denver, Colorado, U.S.
 2005 – Daytona 500, Master Plan – Daytona Beach, Florida, U.S.
 2007 – Breeders' Cup - Oceanport, New Jersey, U.S.
 2008 – Republican National Convention - St. Paul, Minnesota, U.S.
 2015 – Final Four - Indianapolis, Indiana, U.S.

References

External links

 

Architecture firms based in Missouri
Companies based in Kansas City, Missouri
Design companies established in 1983
Populous (company) buildings
1983 establishments in Missouri